Anti-Federalism was a late-18th-century political movement that opposed the creation of a stronger U.S. federal government and which later opposed the ratification of the 1787 Constitution. The previous constitution, called the Articles of Confederation and Perpetual Union, gave state governments more authority. Led by Patrick Henry of Virginia, Anti-Federalists worried, among other things, that the position of president, then a novelty, might evolve into a monarchy. Though the Constitution was ratified and supplanted the Articles of Confederation, Anti-Federalist influence helped lead to the passage of the Bill of Rights.

Nomenclature 
The name "Anti-Federalists" is a misnomer. It was imposed upon the movement by their opponents, the Federalists and it was supposed to mark them as men who "stood against the very political ideas they embraced". According to historian Carol Berkin:

Main beliefs 

 They believed the Constitution needed a Bill of Rights.
 They believed the Constitution created a presidency so powerful that it would become a monarchy.
 They believed the Constitution provided insufficient rights in the courts (e.g., no guarantee of juries in civil cases, nor that criminal case juries be local) and would create an out-of-control judiciary.
 They believed that the national government would be too far away from the people and thus unresponsive to the needs of localities.
 They believed the Constitution would abrogate, at least in part, the power of the states.

History 
During the American Revolution and its immediate aftermath, the term federal was applied to any person who supported the colonial union and the government formed under the Articles of Confederation. After the war, the group that felt the national government under the Articles was too weak appropriated the name Federalist for themselves. Historian Jackson Turner Main wrote, "to them, the man of 'federal principles' approved of 'federal measures,' which meant those that increased the weight and authority or extended the influence of the Confederation Congress."

As the Federalists moved to amend the Articles, eventually leading to the Constitutional Convention, they applied the term anti-federalist to their opposition. The term implied, correctly or not, both opposition to Congress and unpatriotic motives. The Anti-Federalists rejected the term, arguing that they were the true Federalists. In both their correspondence and their local groups, they tried to capture the term. For example, an unknown anti-federalist signed his public correspondence as "A Federal Farmer" and the New York committee opposing the Constitution was called the "Federal Republican Committee."  However the Federalists carried the day and the name Anti-Federalist forever stuck. 
  
The Anti-Federalists were composed of diverse elements, including those opposed to the Constitution because they thought that a stronger government threatened the sovereignty and prestige of the states, localities, or individuals; those that saw in the proposed government a new centralized, disguised "monarchic" power that would only replace the cast-off despotism of Great Britain; and those who simply feared that the new government threatened their personal liberties. Some of the opposition believed that the central government under the Articles of Confederation was sufficient. Still others believed that while the national government under the Articles was too weak, the national government under the Constitution would be too strong. Another complaint of the Anti-Federalists was that the Constitution provided for a centralized rather than federal government (and in The Federalist Papers, James Madison admits that the new Constitution has the characteristics of both a centralized and federal form of the government) and that a truly federal form of government was a leaguing of states as under the Articles of Confederation.

During the period of debate over the ratification of the Constitution, numerous independent local speeches and articles were published all across the country. Initially, many of the articles in opposition were written under pseudonyms, such as "Brutus" (likely Melancton Smith), "Centinel" (likely Samuel Bryan), and "Federal Farmer."  Eventually, famous revolutionary figures such as Patrick Henry came out publicly against the Constitution. They argued that the strong national government proposed by the Federalists was a threat to the rights of individuals and that the president would become a king. They objected to the federal court system created by the proposed constitution. Minority groups also contributed, such as Mercy Otis Warren who disguised herself as "A Colombian Patriot," thought to be Elbridge Gerry. Warren's most notable pamphlet discussed the treatment of minorities and American natural rights; this pamphlet was titled "History of the Rise, Progress, and Termination of the American Revolution". This produced a body of political writing; the best and most influential of these articles and speeches were gathered by historians into a collection known as the Anti-Federalist Papers in allusion to the Federalist Papers.

In many states the opposition to the Constitution was strong (although Delaware, Georgia, and New Jersey ratified quickly with little controversy), and in two states—North Carolina and Rhode Island—it prevented ratification until the definite establishment of the new government practically forced their adherence. Individualism was the strongest element of opposition; the necessity, or at least the desirability, of a bill of rights was almost universally felt. In Rhode Island, resistance against the Constitution was so strong that civil war almost broke out on July 4, 1788, when anti-federalist members of the Country Party led by Judge William West marched into Providence with over 1,000 armed protesters.

The Anti-Federalists played upon these feelings in the ratification convention in Massachusetts. By this point, five of the states had ratified the Constitution with relative ease, but the Massachusetts convention was far more disputed and contentious. After a long debate, a compromise (known as the "Massachusetts compromise") was reached. Massachusetts would ratify the Constitution with recommended provisions in the ratifying instrument that the Constitution be amended with a bill of rights. (The Federalists contended that a conditional ratification would be void, so the recommendation was the strongest support that the ratifying convention could give to a bill of rights short of rejecting the Constitution.)

Four of the next five states to ratify, including New Hampshire, Virginia, and New York, included similar language in their ratification instruments. As a result, once the Constitution became operative in 1789, Congress sent a set of twelve amendments to the states. Ten of these amendments were immediately ratified and became known as the Bill of Rights, with one of the other two becoming the 27th Amendment—almost 200 years later. Thus, while the Anti-Federalists were unsuccessful in their quest to prevent the adoption of the Constitution, their efforts were not totally in vain. The Anti-Federalists thus became recognized as an influential group among the Founding Fathers of the United States.

With the passage of the Constitution and the Bill of Rights, the Anti-Federalist movement was exhausted. Some activists joined the Anti-Administration Party that James Madison and Thomas Jefferson were forming about 1790–91 to oppose the policies of Treasury Secretary Alexander Hamilton; this group soon became the Democratic-Republican Party. When Jefferson took office as the third president in 1801, he replaced Federalist appointees with Democratic-Republicans and sought to focus on issues that allowed the states to make more of their own decisions in matters. He also repealed the whiskey excise and other federal taxes, shut down some federal offices and broadly sought to change the fiscal system that Hamilton had created.

Notable Anti-Federalists 
	

 Patrick Henry, Virginia
 Samuel Adams, Massachusetts
 Joshua Atherton, New Hampshire
 George Mason, Virginia
 Richard Henry Lee, Virginia
 Robert Yates, New York
 James Monroe, Virginia
 Amos Singletary, Massachusetts

 John Hancock, Massachusetts
 Mercy Otis Warren, Massachusetts
 James Warren, Massachusetts
 George Clinton, New York
 Melancton Smith, New York
 James Winthrop, Massachusetts
 Luther Martin, Maryland
 Samuel Bryan, Pennsylvania

See also 
 Albany Antifederal Committee
 Anti-Federalist Papers
 The Complete Anti-Federalist
 Country Party (Rhode Island)
 New Federalism
 Subsidiarity

References

Further reading

External links

A New Nation Votes: American Election Returns, 1787–1825

 
1787 establishments in the United States
1789 disestablishments in the United States
Federalism in the United States
Political theories
Political movements in the United States